The Western Cape Golden Cross is the highest honour awarded by the government of Western Cape.

2007
 Nkosi Albert John Luthuli (posthumously)
 Robert Mangaliso Sobukwe (posthumously)
 Stephen Bantu Biko (posthumously)

2003
 Natalie du Toit
 Chris Barnard (posthumously)

References

External links
 Picture of Golden Cross ribbon

Orders, decorations, and medals of country subdivisions
Orders, decorations, and medals of South Africa
Western Cape